József Konkolics (March 12, 1861 – January 1, 1941) was a Hungarian Slovene writer and cantor, and an associate of Miklós Kovács. Both authors wrote a hymnal in the Prekmurje dialect, which has not survived.

Konkolics was born in Mali Dolenci (today Dolenci, Prekmurje) in the Kingdom of Hungary, the son of the farmer Ádám Konkolics and Mária Nemes. In 1910 Konkolics and Kovács contributed to the appearance of János Zsupánek's hymnal Mrtvecsne peszmi, which also supported the politician József Klekl and his cousin József Klekl Jr., the priest in Dolenci.

He died and is buried in Šalovci.

See also 
 List of Slovene writers and poets in Hungary
 Old hymnal of Martjanci
 Mihály Zsupánek

References 
 Slovenski biografski leksikon

1861 births
1941 deaths
People from the Municipality of Šalovci
Slovenian writers and poets in Hungary